Kayes Airport  is an airport in Kayes, Mali.

Airlines and destinations

References

Airports in Mali
Kayes